The 2022–23 Scottish League Cup Final was an association football match that took place at Hampden Park, Glasgow on 26 February 2023. It was the final match of the 2022–23 Scottish League Cup, the 77th season of the Scottish League Cup (known as the Viaplay Cup for sponsorship reasons), a competition for the 42 teams in the Scottish Professional Football League (SPFL). The Old Firm clubs, Rangers and Celtic, contested the final between each other for a 16th time, with Celtic having won the most recent meeting in 2019. Celtic were the cup holders, having defeated Hibernian 2–1 in the December 2021 final. Rangers last won the competition in 2011.

Route to the final

As both clubs participated in European competitions, they both received a bye through the 2022–23 Scottish League Cup group stage.

Rangers

Celtic

Match

Details

See also
Scottish League Cup Finals played between same clubs: 1957, 1964, 1965, 1966, 1970, 1975, 1978, 1982, 1984 (March), 1986, 1990, 2003, 2009, 2011, 2019

Notes

References

2023 F
2
Sports competitions in Glasgow
February 2023 sports events in the United Kingdom
League Cup final
Celtic F.C. matches
Rangers F.C. matches
2020s in Glasgow
Old Firm matches